Sheshe in Persian mythology is a jinni-like creature that strangles newborn babies on 6th day of their lives.

References

Persian mythology
Mythological monsters
Iranian folklore
Jinn